The arrondissement of Avranches is an arrondissement of France in the Manche department in the Normandy region. It has 134 communes.

Composition

The communes of the arrondissement of Avranches, and their INSEE codes, are:

 Anctoville-sur-Boscq (50008)
 Aucey-la-Plaine (50019)
 Avranches (50025)
 Bacilly (50027)
 Barenton (50029)
 Beauchamps (50038)
 Beauficel (50040)
 Beauvoir (50042)
 Boisyvon (50062)
 Brécey (50074)
 Bréhal (50076)
 Bréville-sur-Mer (50081)
 Bricqueville-sur-Mer (50085)
 Brouains (50088)
 Buais-les-Monts (50090)
 Carolles (50102)
 Céaux (50108)
 Cérences (50109)
 La Chaise-Baudouin (50112)
 Champeaux (50117)
 Chanteloup (50120)
 La Chapelle-Cécelin (50121)
 La Chapelle-Urée (50124)
 Chaulieu (50514)
 Chavoy (50126)
 Coudeville-sur-Mer (50143)
 Coulouvray-Boisbenâtre (50144)
 Courtils (50146)
 Les Cresnays (50152)
 Crollon (50155)
 Cuves (50158)
 Donville-les-Bains (50165)
 Dragey-Ronthon (50167)
 Ducey-Les Chéris (50168)
 Équilly (50174)
 Folligny (50188)
 Le Fresne-Poret (50193)
 Gathemo (50195)
 Genêts (50199)
 Ger (50200)
 La Godefroy (50205)
 Le Grand-Celland (50217)
 Grandparigny (50391)
 Granville (50218)
 Le Grippon (50115)
 Hamelin (50229)
 La Haye-Pesnel (50237)
 Hocquigny (50247)
 Hudimesnil (50252)
 Huisnes-sur-Mer (50253)
 Isigny-le-Buat (50256)
 Juilley (50259)
 Jullouville (50066)
 Juvigny les Vallées (50260)
 Lapenty (50263)
 Lingeard (50271)
 Les Loges-Marchis (50274)
 Les Loges-sur-Brécey (50275)
 Lolif (50276)
 Longueville (50277)
 Le Loreur (50278)
 La Lucerne-d'Outremer (50281)
 Le Luot (50282)
 Marcey-les-Grèves (50288)
 Marcilly (50290)
 Le Mesnil-Adelée (50300)
 Le Mesnil-Aubert (50304)
 Le Mesnil-Gilbert (50312)
 Le Mesnillard (50315)
 Le Mesnil-Ozenne (50317)
 La Meurdraquière (50327)
 Montjoie-Saint-Martin (50347)
 Le Mont-Saint-Michel (50353)
 Mortain-Bocage (50359)
 La Mouche (50361)
 Moulines (50362)
 Muneville-sur-Mer (50365)
 Le Neufbourg (50371)
 Notre-Dame-de-Livoye (50379)
 Le Parc (50535)
 Perriers-en-Beauficel (50397)
 Le Petit-Celland (50399)
 Poilley (50407)
 Pontaubault (50408)
 Pontorson (50410)
 Ponts (50411)
 Précey (50413)
 Reffuveille (50428)
 Romagny-Fontenay (50436)
 Sacey (50443)
 Saint-Aubin-des-Préaux (50447)
 Saint-Aubin-de-Terregatte (50448)
 Saint-Barthélemy (50450)
 Saint-Brice (50451)
 Saint-Brice-de-Landelles (50452)
 Saint-Clément-Rancoudray (50456)
 Saint-Cyr-du-Bailleul (50462)
 Saint-Georges-de-Livoye (50472)
 Saint-Georges-de-Rouelley (50474)
 Saint-Hilaire-du-Harcouët (50484)
 Saint-James (50487)
 Saint-Jean-de-la-Haize (50489)
 Saint-Jean-des-Champs (50493)
 Saint-Jean-du-Corail-des-Bois (50495)
 Saint-Jean-le-Thomas (50496)
 Saint-Laurent-de-Cuves (50499)
 Saint-Laurent-de-Terregatte (50500)
 Saint-Loup (50505)
 Saint-Martin-le-Bouillant (50518)
 Saint-Maur-des-Bois (50521)
 Saint-Michel-de-Montjoie (50525)
 Saint-Nicolas-des-Bois (50529)
 Saint-Ovin (50531)
 Saint-Pair-sur-Mer (50532)
 Saint-Pierre-Langers (50540)
 Saint-Planchers (50541)
 Saint-Pois (50542)
 Saint-Quentin-sur-le-Homme (50543)
 Saint-Sauveur-la-Pommeraye (50549)
 Saint-Senier-de-Beuvron (50553)
 Saint-Senier-sous-Avranches (50554)
 Sartilly-Baie-Bocage (50565)
 Savigny-le-Vieux (50570)
 Servon (50574)
 Sourdeval (50582)
 Subligny (50584)
 Tanis (50589)
 Le Tanu (50590)
 Le Teilleul (50591)
 Tirepied-sur-Sée (50597)
 Vains (50612)
 Le Val-Saint-Père (50616)
 Vernix (50628)
 Yquelon (50647)

History

The arrondissement of Avranches was created in 1800. At the January 2017 reorganisation of the arrondissements of Manche, it gained 14 communes from the arrondissement of Coutances.

As a result of the reorganisation of the cantons of France which came into effect in 2015, the borders of the cantons are no longer related to the borders of the arrondissements. The cantons of the arrondissement of Avranches were, as of January 2015:

 Avranches
 Barenton
 Brécey
 Ducey
 Granville
 La Haye-Pesnel
 Isigny-le-Buat
 Juvigny-le-Tertre
 Mortain
 Pontorson
 Saint-Hilaire-du-Harcouët
 Saint-James
 Saint-Pois
 Sartilly
 Sourdeval
 Le Teilleul

References

Avranches